The Barambah state by-election, 1988 was a by-election held on 16 April 1988 for the Queensland Legislative Assembly seat of Barambah, based in the town of Kingaroy. The by-election was triggered by the resignation of National MP and former Premier Sir Joh Bjelke-Petersen. Until the by-election, the seat had been considered the Nationals' safest seat in Queensland.

Candidates
The candidates were:

 Warren Truss of the National Party, the chairman of the Shire of Kingaroy;
 Trevor Perrett, a Kingaroy grazier and former National Party member  who represented the Citizens Electoral Council, a conservative party;
 John Lang of the Labor Party; and
 Kevin Polzin, a Wondai peanut farmer who used the title "New Country Party" (not related to the New Country Party which was formed by former One Nation members in 2003).

Results
The result was a shock to most observers, and came about largely because 89% of Labor voters' preferences went to the CEC. It was seen by contemporary observers as a clear setback to new party leader Mike Ahern in his efforts to stabilise the party ahead of the 1989 election.

Aftermath
Though elected as a Citizens Electoral Council candidate, Trevor Perrett defected to the National Party in December 1988, and was re-elected as a National candidate at the 1989 state election. Perrett became a minister in the Coalition government of Rob Borbidge and held the seat of Barambah until his defeat at the 1998 state election.

Defeated National Party candidate Warren Truss was elected as the member for the division of Wide Bay at the 1990 Australian federal election. He served as a minister in the government of John Howard and became federal leader of the National Party in 2007 and Deputy Prime Minister of Australia in 2013 and served as a minister in the governments of Tony Abbott and Malcolm Turnbull .

See also
List of Queensland state by-elections

References 

1988 elections in Australia
Queensland state by-elections
1980s in Queensland